Bucknum is a place and former community in Natrona County, in the U.S. state of Wyoming.  It is located about 24 miles west by road from Casper.

History
As the Chicago and North Western built a rail line through the area west from Casper to Lander, it opened a station called Seminole by late December 1905, about 22.4 miles west of Casper by rail.(28 December 1905) Rail Road News Notes, Natrona County Tribune  The "Seminole" name, however, started causing confusion with another Seminole located on the Union Pacific rail line in Wyoming.  Therefore, the station was renamed Bucknum in December 1907 by the railroad for Charles K. Bucknum, a Wyoming legislator and former mayor of Capser who owned land near the site.(27 April 1924). Place Names of Natrona County and Their Derivation As Told By Historian, Casper Daily Tribune  

A post office was established in Bucknum in 1908, and remained in operation until it was discontinued in 1924.Wyoming Place Names, Annals of Wyoming, Vol. 15, No. 1, p. 86 (January 1943)

Bucknum's reported population was 18 in 1917 and 25 in 1924.  A school was reportedly established there by 1922.National Register of Historic Places; Chicago and Northwestern Raiload Depot, Powder Mill. (1987)

As the Chicago and North Western abandoned its line, the communities in this area including Bucknum declined.Old Wyoming Postoffices, Annals of Wyoming, p. 158 (October 1957) Rail continues to serve the area, however.  A Spanish company bought the bentonite mine in the area formerly owned by U.S. Bentonite (off Bucknum Road) in 2015.(30 September 2015). Spanish company restarts Natrona County bentonite operations, Casper Star-Tribune  The Bucknum area now falls under the Casper zip code 82604.

References

Unincorporated communities in Natrona County, Wyoming